The 2011 Indian Federation Cup Final was the 33rd final of the Indian Federation Cup. It was won by Salgaocar of the I-League on 29 September 2011 after beating East Bengal 3-1 at the Salt Lake Stadium.

Details

See also
2011 Indian Federation Cup

References

1
Indian Federation Cup Finals
East Bengal Club matches
Salgaocar FC matches